The Leiria Football Association is one of the 22 District Football Associations that are affiliated with the Portuguese Football Federation. The AF Leiria administers lower-tier football in the district of Leiria.

On 5 January 2014 Leiria FA won the Portuguese Regions Cup and will represent Portugal in the 2015 UEFA Regions' Cup, starting in September 2014.

Background 

The association, commonly abbreviated as the AF Leiria, is the governing body for football in the Portuguese district of Leiria. The Football Association is based in Cruz de Areia in Leiria, close to Escola Secundária Francisco Rodrigues Lobo (Francisco Rodrigues Lobo Secondary School) and LeiriaShopping. The Association's President is Júlio Vieira.

Established on 9 September 1925, known then as Federação Desportiva do Distrito de Leiria (Leiria District Sports Federation), this Federation however ceased to exist in May 1926, due to the trouble times of the politically unstable and financially chaotic years of the Portuguese First Republic. On 20 May 1929, Leiria Football Association was restarted, in his current name. New statutes and regulations was discussed and approved, and elected his first President, Acácio de Almeida Henriques. The founding clubs were: Sport Club Bombarralense, Caldas Sport Clube, Sporting Club das Caldas, Grupo Desportivo "Os Nazarenos", Sporting Club da Nazaré, Atlético Clube Marinhense, Sport Operário Marinhense, Leiria Gimnasio Club, Gimnasio Sportivo Lis e Associação Académica.

Competitions

Leiria clubs compete in the three national levels of the Portuguese football league system in competitions run by the Portuguese League for Professional Football (Primeira Liga and Liga de Honra) and Portuguese Football Federation (Campeonato Nacional de Seniores). 

Caldas Sport Clube join the First National Division, where remained four seasons from 1955–56 to 1958–59. In 2012 União de Leiria were demoted to the Segunda Divisão after failing to meet the deadline to sign the team in Liga de Honra, Leiria was automatically relegated to the third level. Ginásio Clube Alcobaça join the First National Division  in  1982-83 for one season.

Below the Campeonato Nacional de Seniores (Portuguese Third Division) the competitions are organised at a district level (known in Portuguese as Distritais) with each District Association organising its competitions according to geographical and other factors. The AF Leiria runs to league competitions with the Liga de Honra (1ª division) being at the fourth level of the league system and 1ª Divisão (2ª division) at the fifth level.  This second tier is divided into two groups on a geographical basis

In more general terms the AF Leiria currently organises District Championships for Soccer and Futsal for men and women for all age groups including Senior, Junior, Youth, Beginners, Infants and Schools.

Notable clubs affiliated to AF Leiria

Primeira Liga (tier 1)
 none

Liga de Honra (tier 2)
 none

Campeonato Nacional de Seniores (tier 3)
 União de Leiria
 Caldas Sport Clube
 Atlético Clube Marinhense

Distritais (tiers 4 & 5)
 Grupo Desportivo de Peniche
 Atlético Clube Marinhense
 Beneditense
 Ginásio Clube Alcobaça
 Sporting Clube de Pombal
 Associação Desportiva Portomosense

District championships

Historic champions

Recent Division Honra winners

List of member clubs

Footnote
 1-10 games in Portuguese Cup.     *
 11-100 games in Portuguese Cup.  * *
 101+ games in Portuguese Cup.     * * *

See also
 Portuguese District Football Associations
 Portuguese football competitions
 List of football clubs in Portugal

References

External links
 A.F. Leiria 

Leiria
Leiria
Sport in Leiria
1925 establishments in Portugal